Tennis events were contested at the 1993 Summer Universiade in Buffalo, New York, United States.

Medal summary

Medal table

See also
 Tennis at the Summer Universiade

References 

 
 Results of The 17th Universiade '93 Buffalo: Tennis (universiade.fjct.fit.ac.jp)

1993
Universiade
1993 Summer Universiade
Tennis tournaments in New York (state)